Conover is a city in Catawba County, North Carolina, United States. The population was 8,421 as of the 2020 census. It is part of the Hickory–Lenoir–Morganton Metropolitan Statistical Area and Charlotte Metropolitan Area.

History
The City of Conover began to develop in the mid-1800s as a “Y” intersection of the railroad traversing North Carolina. Although originally called Wye Town, legend says the name "Canova" was adopted, but transposed to Conover over several years. The City of Conover was chartered in 1876 and incorporated in 1877.

The Bolick Historic District and George Huffman Farm are listed on the National Register of Historic Places.

Geography

Conover is located in the geographic center, as well as the population center, of Catawba County and is bordered by the City of Hickory to the west, the City of Newton to the south, and the City of Claremont to the east. Interstate 40 traverses Conover, with access from four major exits (128, 130, 132, and 133). U.S. Route 70, U.S. Route 321, and North Carolina Highway 16 all pass through Conover, making Conover one of the most easily accessible cities in the Charlotte Metro Region.

Demographics

2020 census

As of the 2020 United States census, there were 8,421 people, 3,346 households, and 2,265 families residing in the city.

2010 census
As of the 2010 census there were 8,165 people, 3,368 households, and 2,182 families residing in the city. The population density was 738.1 people per square mile (249.2/km). There were 3,654 housing units at an average density of 328.5 per square mile (108.7/km). The racial makeup of the city was 78.1% White, 9.2% African American, 0.2% Native American, 4.2% Asian,  5.8% from other races, and 2.5% from two or more races. Hispanic or Latino of any race were 12.2% of the population.

There were 3,654 households, out of which 30.1% had children under the age of 18 living with them, 47.1% were married couples living together, 12.2% had a female householder with no husband present, and 35.2% were non-families. 30.6% of all households were made up of individuals, and 13.2% had someone living alone who was 65 years of age or older. The average household size was 2.39 and the average family size was 2.96.

City Services

Public Works
The Conover Public Works Department provides Water, Street Construction, Maintenance and Repair, Storm Water Management, Solid Waste and Recycling, Water Treatment, Grounds and Parks and Fleet Maintenance services to the residents of Conover.

Fire-Rescue
The Conover Fire Department provides Fire Suppression, Emergency Medical Services, Hazardous Materials (HAZMAT) Mitigation, Technical Rescues, Public Education, and Fire Prevention and Inspection with 18 full-time and 40 part-time/volunteer firefighters operating out of three fire stations.

Law Enforcement
The Conover Police Department is staffed by 27 full-time officers, 1 Code Enforcement officer, 5 part-time employees, and 5 volunteer police chaplains.

Emergency Medical Services
Emergency Medical Services for the City of Conover are provided by CCEMS, the Catawba County EMS Agency.

Transportation 
Conover is located in the western piedmont area of North Carolina.

Interstate 40 traverses the city along with other major roads including US 70, US 321 and NC 16, making it easy to access the city from any direction.

Mass transit
Greenway Bus Transportation (main office located in Conover)

Parks and Recreation
Conover is home of the Rock Barn Country Club and Spa, a golf club with two Championship 18-hole courses and renowned spa that was home to the Greater Hickory Classic at Rock Barn, a PGA Champions Tour Event.

Conover has nine Neighborhood Parks and one Greenway:

Downtown Park - , with gazebo, walking trails and playground equipment.
Gateway Park - a linear park that provides a pedestrian/bicycle link into downtown.
Hines Park - located in the ConWest Business Park, the park and its gazebo are mainly used by employees of nearby businesses.
Hunsucker Park - located in the largest neighborhood in the city, Lecho Park, the park occupies  and contains playground equipment.
Majestic Park - located in the southwest quadrant of the city, the park occupies  and contains recreation equipment.
Rowe Park - The smallest of the city's parks, it contains a gazebo, picnic table, and a swing set.
Travis Park - Located in the northwest quadrant of the city, the park contains benches, a picnic table and recreation equipment.
Washington/Southwest Park - , the park includes a basketball court and baseball field, along with recreation equipment.
Conover City Park - , with a picnic area, playground equipment, walking trails, splash pad and wetlands.
Lyle Creek Greenway - A 1.5 mile long enhanced surface natural trail that follows Lyle Creek and provides great relaxation and wildlife viewing. This trail consists of both wooded areas and open fields.

Education
The City of Conover is served by Newton-Conover City Schools and Catawba County Schools.

Elementary schools
Shuford Elementary School (Newton-Conover City Schools)
South Newton Elementary School (Newton-Conover City Schools)
North Newton Elementary School (Newton-Conover City Schools)
Conover School (Newton-Conover City Schools)
Lyle Creek Elementary School (Catawba County Schools)
St. Stephens Elementary School (Catawba County Schools)

Middle schools
Newton-Conover Middle School (Newton-Conover City Schools)

Private schools
Concordia Christian Day School (K–8)

NASCAR in Conover
Conover is home to the Transportation Office for NASCAR. Conover is also home to Dale Jarrett Inc., and Morgan Shepherd Racing Ventures.

Notable people

Mark K. Hilton, member of the North Carolina General Assembly 2001–2013
Tommy Houston, NASCAR Cup Series and Xfinity Series driver
W. Stine Isenhower, member of the North Carolina House of Representatives 1986–1992
Dale Jarrett, NASCAR Cup Series champion, three-time Daytona 500 champion, and 2014 NASCAR Hall of Fame inductee
Glenn Jarrett, NASCAR Cup Series and Xfinity Series driver
Jason Jarrett, NASCAR Cup Series and Xfinity Series driver
Ned Jarrett, two-time NASCAR champion and 2011 NASCAR Hall of Fame inductee
Robert Kearns, bassist who has played with several notable bands
Morgan Shepherd, NASCAR Cup Series driver and NASCAR team owner
Chris Washburn, NBA player

References

External links

Cities in North Carolina
Cities in Catawba County, North Carolina